Mark Lewis Jones (born 31 August 1964) is a Welsh actor, whose roles include that of a First Order Captain Moden Canady in Star Wars: The Last Jedi, a police inspector in BBC drama series 55 Degrees North, a whaler in the film Master and Commander: The Far Side of the World, soldier Tecton in Troy and Rob Morgan in the series Stella. He is known for being the voice of Letho of Gulet the King Slayer in The Witcher 2 and 3.

Early life
Mark Lewis Jones was born in Rhosllannerchrugog near Wrexham, Wales. He began acting as a teenager with the Clwyd Youth Theatre and trained at the Royal Welsh College of Music & Drama.

Career
Jones has acted with the Royal Shakespeare Company, and at Shakespeare's Globe Theatre in London.

His television roles include appearances in This Life, Holby City, Spooks, Murphy's Law, Waking the Dead and Torchwood. Perhaps his most significant role for BBC television was as Detective Inspector Russell Bing in the police drama 55 Degrees North, in which he played an outspoken, opinionated and at times humorous police officer, in a complex and intricately crafted series.

He also played Detective Sergeant Ray Lloyd in police drama Murder Prevention. His two most renowned appearances in Hollywood blockbusters were as Hogg the Whaler in Master and Commander: The Far Side of the World, and Tecton, a soldier in Troy.

In 2001, he portrayed Uther Pendragon, father of King Arthur and second husband of Igraine, in the American TV miniseries The Mists of Avalon. He played Irfon in S4C's Con Passionate, Josi in Sian James' Calon Gaeth, and Bryan Jones in Y Pris.

In 2009 he was a guest in the BBC Cardiff Singer of the World competition, broadcast on 11 June on BBC Two Wales.

Jones auditioned for Star Wars: The Force Awakens (2015) but did not get the part. However, he was later offered the part of Captain Canady for the sequel, Star Wars: The Last Jedi. He appears prominently in the opening sequences and says he played the part with "a posh Welsh accent".

In 2016, Jones won a BAFTA Cymru award for Best Actor in The Passing / Yr Ymadawiad. He was nominated in the same category at the 2013 Awards for Stella, 2017 Awards for The Lighthouse, 2018 Awards for Keeping Faith and in 2021 for Gangs of London.

Jones was awarded a Fellowship from the Royal Welsh College of Music & Drama in June 2022.

Stage
Lord Grey and Henry (Earl of Richmond), Richard III, Royal Shakespeare Company, London, 1993
Leontes, The Winter's Tale, Globe Theatre, London, 1997
Milantius, The Maid's Tragedy, Globe Theatre, 1997
Mark Antony, Julius Caesar, Globe Theatre, 1999
Taurus, Diomedes, and Sextus Pompeius, Antony and Cleopatra, Globe Theatre, 1999
Appeared as Billy, Cardiff East, as Willy Nilly, Under Milk Wood, and as Bonario, Volpone, all National Theatre, London; as Costard, Love's Labour's Lost, as Lorenzo, The Merchant of Venice, and as Ferdinand, The Tempest, all Royal Shakespeare Company, Stratford-upon-Avon, England; as Tristram, Morte d'Arthur, and as Florizel and Antigonas, The Winter's Tale, both Lyric Theatre, London; as a pioneer, Ingolstadt, Gate Theatre; and as Danton and father, Snow Palace, Tricycle Theatre, Kilburn, Yorkshire, England
Aston, The Caretaker, Sherman Theatre, Cardiff, 1990
JB Feller in The Man Who Had All the Luck by Arthur Miller at The Donmar Warehouse, 28 Feb – 5 April 2008
Sergeant-Major Reg Drummond in Privates on Parade by Peter Nichols at Noël Coward Theatre, 1 December 2012 – 2 March 2013

Radio
 Appeared in radio broadcasts of Cadfael and Cocaine.
Samson in Julian Simpson's The Listener

Filmography

Film

Television

Video games

Self

Personal life
In 2014, Jones took part in the Marathon des Sables, in the Sahara Desert, with fellow Welsh actor Richard Harrington. In April 2018 he ran the inaugural Wales Marathon held in Newport.

Jones is an Ambassador for Believe Organ Donor Support, Marie Curie UK  and Cerebral Palsy Cymru.

References

External links

1964 births
Living people
People from Rhosllanerchrugog
Alumni of the Royal Welsh College of Music & Drama
Welsh male film actors
Welsh male stage actors
Welsh male television actors
21st-century Welsh male actors
20th-century Welsh male actors
Welsh-speaking actors